Peter Francis Dante (born December 16, 1968) is an American character actor and comedian. He frequently appears in films from Happy Madison Productions alongside his friend Adam Sandler.

Career
Dante's roles are usually alongside Jonathan Loughran and/or Allen Covert. He played Peter in Little Nicky. In Grandma's Boy he played Dante. He played a lawyer named Tommy in Adam Sandler's movie Big Daddy. He played the quarterback Gee Grenouille in The Waterboy and Murph "Murphy" in Mr. Deeds. He played a security guard in 50 First Dates.

Dante was an actor and producer for the film Grandma's Boy. In the film, Dante played a zany drug dealer with a pet chimpanzee, lion and elephant. He played a firefighter in the film I Now Pronounce You Chuck and Larry, and Danny Guiterrez in Strange Wilderness. He also played the role of Steve Spirou's son in Adam Sandler's 2012 film That's My Boy.

Dante also worked in Grown Ups 2 as Officer Peter Dante who was paired up with Shaquille O'Neal's character Officer Fluzoo.

That was the last Happy Madison production he was involved in, followed by appearances in episodes of Typical Rick and Sugar and Toys. On September 19, 2020, Dante was arrested in Los Angeles on Wednesday at 9:40 A.M. with a felony charge after an altercation with his neighbor. He was booked in Los Angeles county jail and was released that night after posting a $50,000 bond. According to the reports, Dante was bothered by loud noises from construction work being done at a neighbor's residence and allegedly "threatened to kill" his neighbor and harm his wife and kids. This is not Dante's first arrest for making threats, the outlet notes. He was kicked out of a hotel and arrested in 2013 for making violent threats and using racial slurs. The last film production he worked in was the independent film, The Pizza Joint, released in 2021.

Music
Dante is also a musician and singer/songwriter. He recorded with Adam Sandler and Buck Simmonds. He is a member of the music group Rad Omen along with Dirt Nasty, DJ Troublemaker, Steven Laing and Benji Madden.  In 2011 he released his debut album Peace, Love and Freedom. He also appeared in a music video with Afroman in 2015. As of 2020, his most popular songs are "Dirty Road" and "My Purple Tree And Me" a collaboration with indie artist Shadoe.

Education
Dante spent a post-graduate year (1987-1988) at Fork Union Military Academy playing football and lacrosse. He stated in an interview that "It was a good experience going down South".

He is a graduate of Hofstra University, where he played lacrosse. He was an assistant coach for the lacrosse team at Loyola Marymount University for the 2011 season and has coached many club teams, including the Riptide lacrosse team, that made it to the state championships.

Filmography
The Jeff Foxworthy Show (1995, TV, 1 episode) 
The Larry Sanders Show (1995–96, TV, 3 episodes) 
The Wedding Singer as Dave's friend
The Waterboy as Gee Grenouille
Matters of Consequence
Big Daddy as Tommy Grayton 
Little Nicky as Peter
Mr. Deeds as Murph
Eight Crazy Nights as Foot Locker guy (voice)
El Santurario
Dickie Roberts: Former Child Star  as himself
Stuck On You as Officer J.J. Hill
50 First Dates as Security Guard
Grandma's Boy as Dante
The King of Queens (2007, TV, 1 episode) 
I Now Pronounce You Chuck and Larry as a NYC fireman
Strange Wilderness as Danny Gutierrez
Costa Rican Summer
Just Go with It as Pick-Up Guy #2
Bucky Larson: Born to Be a Star as Dante
Renegade: Rebel Pilot
Jack and Jill as Carol's Boyfriend
That's My Boy as Dante Spirou
Grown Ups 2 as Officer Peter Dante

References and notes

External links

1968 births
Male actors from Connecticut
American male film actors
Hofstra Pride men's lacrosse players
People from West Hartford, Connecticut
Living people